Lucas Scott "Luke" Woolmer (born 25 January 1965) is an Australian politician. He was a Liberal Party member of the Legislative Assembly of Queensland from 1995 to 1998, representing the electorate of Springwood.

Early career
Prior to 1995 Springwood was held by Molly Robson of the Labor Party, who held the seat in the 1992 election with a majority of 10%. Woolmer, who worked in the Information Technology sector prior to running for parliament, entered the election on the tail of the so-called "koala tollway" controversy, in which the Labor government had planned to build a tollway through a koala sanctuary. Woolmer won the election by 18.5%, having received a swing of 19.4% on the back of the preferences from the minor parties.

Parliament
While in parliament Woolmer served as an undersecretary with a focus on IT issues. He helped to establish the government's Ministerial Council for IT & T, and he had hoped to become the state's first IT minister after the 1998 election. This, however, was not to be, as a swing back to Labor saw Woolmer lose his seat to Labor's Grant Musgrove by a narrow margin.

Later years
After his 1998 loss, Woolmer ran unsuccessfully for pre-selection in the Federal seat of McPherson, before returning to work in the IT sector.

References

Liberal Party of Australia members of the Parliament of Queensland
1965 births
Living people
Members of the Queensland Legislative Assembly